John Glennon may refer to:

 John J. Glennon (1862–1946), American, Roman Catholic Cardinal and Archbishop
John Glennon (writer and actor) (born 1931), American stage actor, writer, screenwriter, and playwright
 John Alan Glennon (born 1970), American geographer and explorer